Adoption & Fostering is a quarterly peer-reviewed academic journal covering research on adoption and foster care.   It was established in 1977 and is published by SAGE Publications on behalf of Coram BAAF. Miranda Davies is its Managing Editor.

Abstracting and indexing 
The journal is abstracted and indexed in:

External links 
 

English-language journals
Publications established in 1977
Quarterly journals
SAGE Publishing academic journals
Sociology journals
Works about adoption
1977 establishments in England